Svetulka is a village in Ardino Municipality, Kardzhali Province, southern-central Bulgaria. It covers an area of 7.624 square kilometres and as of 2007 it had a population of 182 people.

Honours
Svetulka Island in Antarctica is named after the village of Svetulka.

References

Villages in Kardzhali Province